The 1994 Oregon Ducks football team represented the University of Oregon in the Pacific-10 Conference during the 1994 NCAA Division I-A football season. The Ducks were led by head coach Rich Brooks, who was in his 18th and final season as head coach, and played their home games at Autzen Stadium in Eugene, Oregon.

Oregon was 9–3 in the regular season and won their first ever outright conference championship (7–1); they appeared in the Rose Bowl for the first time in 37 years.

Two consecutive non-conference losses in September had many calling for Brooks' resignation.

Schedule

Roster

Game summaries

Portland State

Hawaii

Utah

Iowa

USC

Washington State

California

Washington

In previous matchups, Oregon had their share of disappointment: Mark Lee returned a punt 59 yards for touchdown to win the game in 1979.  The defense held the #9-ranked Huskies to 109 yards and 3 first downs in 1984, but still fell 17–10. This, combined with Washington's 17–4 record against the Ducks, including a five-game win streak, had many Oregon fans fearing the worst.

In the 1994 edition of the heated rivalry with the University of Washington, the #9-ranked Huskies came into Autzen Stadium with a 5–1 record, including a victory over the University of Miami, snapping a 58-game home winning streak. The game was a tough and close contest, with the Ducks clinging to a 24–20 lead late in the game. UW quarterback Damon Huard guided the Huskies to a first down on the 9-yard line with plenty of time remaining. Huard dropped back and whipped the ball to wide receiver Dave Janoski. U of O freshman cornerback Kenny Wheaton stepped in front of the pass, intercepted it and headed up the sideline for a clinching touchdown, putting Oregon ahead for good 31–20.

Oregon won its final six games to carry them to the Rose Bowl. It's now tradition at all of the Oregon Ducks football games to play "The Pick" on the DuckVision right before the Ducks run onto the field.

Arizona

Arizona State

Stanford

Oregon State

Rose Bowl

References

Citations

Bibliography
 McCann, Michael C. (1995). Oregon Ducks Football: 100 Years of Glory. Eugene, Oregon: McCann Communications Corp. .

Oregon
Oregon Ducks football seasons
Pac-12 Conference football champion seasons
Oregon Ducks football